Lomatium congdonii, known by the common names Mariposa desertparsley and Congdon's lomatium, is a species of flowering plant in the carrot family .

Distribution
Lomatium congdonii is endemic to California, where it is known from only about 20 occurrences in the Sierra Nevada foothills of Mariposa and Tuolumne Counties. It grows in oak woodland habitat, often on serpentine soils.

Description
Lomatium congdonii is a perennial herb growing from a fibrous basal stem and taproot and producing upright inflorescences and leaves. The leaves are up to about 20 centimeters long and are intricately divided into many sharp-pointed segments. The erect inflorescence is an umbel of light yellow flowers.

See also
Joseph Whipple Congdon
List of plants of the Sierra Nevada (U.S.)

References

External links
 Calflora Database: Lomatium congdonii (Mariposa desertparsley, Congdon's lomatium)
Jepson Manual eFlora (TJM2) treatment of Lomatium congdonii
USDA Plants Profile for Lomatium congdonii (Mariposa desertparsley)
CalPhotos gallery — Lomatium congdonii

congdonii
Endemic flora of California
Flora of the Sierra Nevada (United States)
Natural history of the California chaparral and woodlands
Natural history of Mariposa County, California
Natural history of Tuolumne County, California